Egfrid may refer to:

Egfrid of Lindisfarne, Bishop of Lindisfarne from 821 until his death
Egfrid of Northumbria, King of Northumbria from 670 until his death
, launched at Shields and condemned at Saint Helena in 1821